In vitro maturation
 Protein Data Bank (PDB) ligand code for ivermectin
 Innoson Vehicle Manufacturing, in Nigeria

See also 
 IVM Podcasts, a podcasting company in India.